Lidia San José Segura (born in Madrid, January 2, 1983) is a Spanish television and theatre actress.

Biography
San José has a BA in History by the Faculty of Arts of the Complutense University of Madrid, and was a presenter on the Spanish documentary series Reyes de España on History Channel. She has appeared in numerous Spanish television series such as A las once en casa or ¡Ala... Dina!.

In 2006 San José posed for the Spanish edition of  Maxim.

In September 2008 she replaced Carmen Morales in the play Olvida los tambores.

In August 2009 she played the role of Carla Bruni in the theater play Escándalo en palacio by Pedro Ruiz.

Her brother is the actor Jorge San José Segura.

Filmography

References

1983 births
Living people
Actresses from Madrid
Spanish television actresses
Complutense University of Madrid alumni
20th-century Spanish actresses
21st-century Spanish actresses